Apology for Murder is a 1945 American film noir directed by Sam Newfield and starring Ann Savage, Hugh Beaumont, Russell Hicks and Charles D. Brown.

The plot of Apology for Murder is a blatant rip-off of the seminal film noir Double Indemnity which was released the previous year. The production company Producers Releasing Corporation, one of the B movie studios of Hollywood’s Poverty Row, wanted to take advantage of Double Indemnity's huge success and originally intended to call the film Single Indemnity. However, Paramount Pictures, the production company of Double Indemnity, obtained an injunction that barred the film's release under that title. PRC therefore changed the title to Apology for Murder.

Much acclaimed B movie director Edgar G. Ulmer, who was working at PRC at the time Apology for Murder was made, claimed during a conversation with director Peter Bogdanovich that he wrote the original Single Indemnity script for producer Sigmund Neufeld. Ulmer, though, erroneously believed that the film made from it was finally released under the title Blonde Ice, which is a totally different film produced by Film Classics.

Plot
Tough reporter Kenny Blake (Beaumont) falls in love with sultry Toni Kirkland (Savage) who is married to a much older man (Hicks). She seduces him to murder her husband, watching coldly as Kenny strikes her husband to death on a country road. Together, they push the body of Hicks in his car over a nearby cliff.

It is soon revealed as a murder when the police confirm Hick's car was in neutral gear, plus the body of Hicks did not bleed, signifying he was dead before the crash. City editor Ward McKee (Brown), Kenny's boss and best friend, begins to pursue the tangled threads of the crime relentlessly and gradually closes the net on Kenny. In the end Toni and Kenny shoot each other. As he dies, Kenny types out his confession to the crime.

Cast
 Ann Savage as Toni Kirkland
 Hugh Beaumont as Kenny Blake
 Russell Hicks as Harvey Kirkland
 Charles D. Brown as Ward McKee
 Pierre Watkin as Craig Jordan
 Sarah Padden as Maggie, the Janitress
 Norman Willis as Allen Webb
 Eva Novak as Maid
 Budd Buster as Jed, the Caretaker
 George Sherwood as Police Lt. Edwards
 Wheaton Chambers as Minister
 Arch Hall Sr. as Paul

References

External links
 
 
 
 

1945 films
1945 drama films
American drama films
American black-and-white films
1940s English-language films
Film noir
Producers Releasing Corporation films
Films directed by Sam Newfield
1940s American films